Spring City is a city in Sanpete County, Utah, United States. The population was 988 at the 2010 census.

Description
Although it is still largely a farming town, Spring City is becoming increasingly known as an artist community.  Many excellent examples of Mormon pioneer architecture exist throughout the town. In 2010, Forbes magazine identified Spring City as one of the prettiest towns in America.

Orson Hyde, an early apostle of the Church of Jesus Christ of Latter-day Saints, is buried in the Spring City Cemetery.

Geography
According to the United States Census Bureau, the city has a total area of 1.3 square miles (3.5 km2), all land.

History

Spring City was first known as "Allred Settlement". The original settlers in 1852 were under the leadership of James Allred and most of them were his family members. When an LDS ward was organized there in 1853, Ruben W. Allred was appointed the first bishop. The settlement was abandoned in the summer of 1853 because of ongoing conflict with the indigenous people of the area, the Ute people, including San Pitch Utes, from which Sanpete County derives its name. The village was reestablished as "Springtown" in 1859 by William Black, George Black and Joseph S. Black. Christen G. Larsen was made bishop of a new LDS ward in 1860.

Beginning in 1853, the Allred family and other church leaders began to encourage Danish immigrants to settle in Sanpete County, and, particularly after the community was reestablished in 1859, to join the Allred Settlement.

By the mid-1860s locals referred to the north side of town as "Little Copenhagen" or "Little Denmark".

Spring City was also a site of fighting during the Black Hawk War.

As of 2018 the city's mayor Jack Monnett is the only member of the Constitution Party to hold a mayoral seat in the US.

Demographics

The 2000 census recorded 956 people, 312 households, and 243 families residing in the city. The population density was 720.5 people per square mile (277.5/km2). There were 370 housing units at an average density of 278.8 per square mile (107.4/km2). The racial makeup of the city was 94.98% White, 0.10% African American, 0.31% Native American, 0.21% Asian, 0.42% Pacific Islander, 1.88% from other races, and 2.09% from two or more races. Hispanic or Latino people of any race were 3.56% of the population.

There were 312 households, out of which 41.7% had children under the age of 18 living with them, 70.2% were married couples living together, 6.4% had a female householder with no husband present, and 22.1% were non-families. 17.6% of all households were made up of individuals, and 8.3% had someone living alone who was 65 years of age or older. The average household size was 3.06 and the average family size was 3.53.

In the city, the population was spread out, with 33.6% under the age of 18, 11.1% from 18 to 24, 23.8% from 25 to 44, 21.8% from 45 to 64, and 9.7% who were 65 years of age or older. The median age was 30 years. For every 100 females, there were 96.3 males. For every 100 females age 18 and over, there were 99.7 males.

The median income for a household in the city was $34,609, and the median income for a family was $37,813. Males had a median income of $36,500 versus $20,417 for females. The per capita income for the city was $12,310. About 15.6% of families and 20.2% of the population were below the poverty line, including 25.3% of those under age 18 and 17.7% of those age 65 or over.

Education
Spring City is located in the North Sanpete School District and contains an elementary school. Students attend middle school at North Sanpete Middle School in Moroni and high school at North Sanpete High School in Mount Pleasant.

Spring City Historic District

The Spring City Historic District boundaries coincide with the city limits. This historical designation recognizes Spring City's status as a well-preserved example of a Mormon settlement. The district is primarily residential in character, but includes the town's commercial core.

Spring City was listed on the National Register of Historic Places on October 22, 1980.

Notable people
 Orson Hyde, Mormon apostle
 Jacob Johnson, U.S. Representative from Utah
 Joel Skousen, Survivalist and Author

See also

 List of cities and towns in Utah
 National Register of Historic Places in Sanpete County, Utah

References

External links

 
 
 
 
 
 
 
 
 
 
 
 
 
 
 
 

Cities in Sanpete County, Utah
Cities in Utah
Populated places established in 1859
1859 establishments in Utah Territory
Historic American Buildings Survey in Utah
Historic districts on the National Register of Historic Places in Utah
National Register of Historic Places in Sanpete County, Utah